Niccol is a surname. Notable people with the surname include:
 Andrew Niccol (born 1964), New Zealand screenwriter, producer, and director
 George Turnbull Niccol (1858–1940), New Zealand shipbuilder and ship owner
 Henry Niccol (1819–1887), New Zealand shipbuilder, father of George

See also 
 Nicoll

English-language surnames
Patronymic surnames
Surnames from given names